Alex Wilhelm is a music executive, A&R representative and the co-owner of 48 Hours Entertainment, based in Los Angeles. Before launching his own company, Alex worked in senior A&R roles at record companies such as Warner Records, Capitol Records, and Atlantic Records/APG. He has signed various multi-platinum selling artists, served on the Grammy Awards Committee, and has been included on Billboard's prestigious "40 under 40" list.

Career

Crazed Hits
Alex Wilhelm started his career by founding influential independent A&R company Crazed Hits, through which he discovered a variety of major recording artists, including LMFAO, Drake, Imagine Dragons, The Weeknd, Nicki Minaj, Owl City, Brantley Gilbert, Mike Posner, Jessie J, Odd Future, and others. 

During his time at Crazed Hits, Alex Wilhelm also discovered the hit song "If I Were A Boy", which was later recorded by Beyoncé.

Warner Bros. Records
In October 2012, Alex Wilhelm became the Director of A&R at Warner Bros. Records, where he was involved in signing and/or A&R'ing artists such as Jason Derulo, and Bebe Rexha.

Capitol Music Group
In September 2014, Alex Wilhelm joined Capitol Music Group, where he was promoted to Senior Director of A&R. At Capitol, Alex Wilhelm signed multi-platinum recording artist Calum Scott, who scored international hits with his singles "Dancing On My Own" and "You Are The Reason." Calum's platinum-selling debut album, "Only Human," has generated over 6 billion streams to date. Wilhelm also brought pop rapper Silento to Capitol who scored an international hit with his debut single  "Watch Me (Whip/Nae Nae)", certified six-times Platinum in the United States.

Atlantic Records/APG
In September 2017, Alex Wilhelm joined APG and Atlantic Records, where he was promoted to VP of A&R and ran the A&R Research Department. Additionally, he was the lead consultant at Warner Music Group for Sodatone, a machine-learning and AI-driven A&R Data Platform. WMG acquired Sodatone in 2018.

48 Hours Entertainment
In April 2021, Wilhelm co-founded 48 Hours Entertainment together with former Rolling Stones and Garbage manager Steve Moir, who now manages John Mayer, The Black Keys and Mickey Guyton.

In August 2021, Wilhelm was named one of the 40 most powerful music executives under the age of 40 by Billboard magazine.

In January 2023, Wilhelm's client Hotel Ugly peaked at #22 on the Spotify U.S. Chart and entered the Billboard Hot 100 with their hit single "Shut Up My Mom's Calling." The song, which was released independently, generated over 400 million streams globally.

References

External links
 Official Website
 
 LinkedIn Profile

A&R people
Living people
American music industry executives
Capitol Records
Warner Records
Year of birth missing (living people)